Venefica ocella is an eel in the family Nettastomatidae (duckbill/witch eels). It was described by Samuel Garman in 1899. It is a marine, deep water-dwelling eel which is known from the eastern Pacific Ocean.

References

Nettastomatidae
Fish described in 1899